Twelve teams qualified for the women's basketball at the 2020 Summer Olympics tournament . The host nation and the 2018 World Cup winner qualified. Those two teams, however, had to play in the pre-qualifying and qualifying tournaments and took one of the qualifying spots from those tournaments. Thus, while two of the World Qualifying Tournaments provided quota spots to their three top teams, the other two tournaments provided quota spots only to the top two teams plus either the host nation or the World Cup winner.

Teams had to qualify for the Women's Olympic Qualifying Tournaments through Women's EuroBasket or Pre-Olympic Qualifying Tournaments (which themselves must be qualified for through Continental Cups).

Qualification
The cities of Ostend, Bourges, Belgrade, and Foshan had been awarded the hosting rights of the four FIBA Women's Olympic Qualifying Tournaments, from 6 to 9 February 2020. However, the Foshan tournament was moved to Belgrade due to concerns over the COVID-19 pandemic.

Pre-qualifying tournaments

Europe

EuroBasket
The top six teams in EuroBasket Women 2019 qualified directly to the WOQTs.

Africa

Africa pre-qualifying tournament
The top six teams from the 2019 Women's Afrobasket played in the Africa pre-qualifying tournament from 14 to 17 November 2019. The top two teams in the PQT advanced to the WOQTs. The tournament was held in Mozambique.

All times are local (UTC+2).

Preliminary round
The draw was held on 18 August 2019.

Group A

Group B

Semifinals
There were no final played. The two winners of the semifinals advanced to the Olympic Qualifying tournament.

Americas

Americas pre-qualifying tournaments
The top eight teams in the 2019 FIBA Women's AmeriCup played in two Americas pre-qualifying tournaments, with four teams in each tournament. The top two teams in each PQT advanced to the WOQTs.

The draw was held on 30 September 2019. Canada and Argentina each hosted one tournament.

Group A

All times are local (UTC−7).

Group B

All times are local (UTC−3).

Asia/Oceania

Asia/Oceania pre-qualifying tournaments
The eight teams which took part in the 2019 FIBA Women's Asia Cup, including Olympic host Japan, played in two Asia/Oceania pre-qualifying tournaments, with four teams in each tournament. For the tournament in which Japan plays, Japan and the best other team advanced to the WOQTs. For the other tournament, the top two teams advanced.

The 2019 FIBA Women's Asia Cup was planned to have two divisions, Division A and B. Under the original set-up, only the top seven teams of Division A and the top team of Division B would have advanced to the Asia/Oceania qualifiers. However, Division B of was not held since there was no nation willing to host the tournament, and India which placed last in the FIBA Women's Asia Cup were given a slot in the Asia/Oceania qualifiers.

The draw was held on 28 September 2019. The tournaments were held in New Zealand and Malaysia.

Group A

All times are local (UTC+13).

Group B

All times are local (UTC+8).

Olympic Qualifying Tournaments

Qualification for WOQTs
There was a pre-qualifying process for the WOQTs. European teams had to finish in the top six of EuroBasket, while teams from the Americas, Asia (including Oceania), and Africa played in pre-qualifying tournaments. 16 total teams qualified for the WOQTs. The Olympic host (Japan) and the World Cup winner (United States) automatically qualified for the WOQTs, each taking a spot from their respective continent.

References

Basketball at the 2020 Summer Olympics
Qualification for the 2020 Summer Olympics
2020
Impact of the COVID-19 pandemic on the 2020 Summer Olympics